Ramnagar, is a town, or Nagar Palika Parishad, in Ramnagar, Nainital district in the state of Uttarakhand in India.

Demographics 
According to the 2011 Indian Census, the town consists of 54,787 people. The state of Uttarakhand has literacy rate of 87.6 percent which is higher than Nation's average of 74.04 percent.

References

External links 

Tourism in Uttarakhand
Cities and towns in Nainital district